Grossberg may refer to:

Carl Grossberg (1894-1940), German painter 
Lawrence Grossberg (born 1947), American academic 
Ned Grossberg, fictional character from the Max Headroom series
Rami Grossberg, American mathematician
Stephen Grossberg, American scientist
Amy Grossberg and Brian Peterson, American couple convicted of manslaughter